Jiangdong District was a former district of the sub-provincial city of Ningbo in Zhejiang, China.

Administrative divisions
Subdistricts:
Baizhang Subdistrict (百丈街道), Baihe Subdistrict (白鹤街道), Dongjiao Subdistrict (东郊街道), Dongliu Subdistrict (东柳街道), Dongsheng Subdistrict (东胜街道), Fuming Subdistrict (福明街道), Minglou Subdistrict (明楼街道), Xinming Subdistrict (新明街道)

References

Geography of Ningbo
Districts of Zhejiang
Former districts of China